Louis Kevin Celestin (born August 25, 1992), known professionally as Kaytranada (stylized as KAYTRANADA, shortened as KAYTRA), is a Haitian-Canadian record producer, and DJ. Celestin rose to prominence after releasing a series of mixtapes, remixes, and original music projects beginning in 2010 under the alias Kaytradamus. By 2013, and under the moniker Kaytranada, he began gaining wider recognition and, the following year, signed a deal with XL Recordings, with whom he would release his critically acclaimed debut studio album 99.9% in 2016. In 2019, he released its follow-up, Bubba, for which he won two Grammy Awards including Best Dance/Electronic Album. Celestin is one half of the hip hop duo The Celestics, along with his brother Lou Phelps.

Early life
Kaytranada was born Louis Kevin Celestin on August 25, 1992, in Port-au-Prince, Haiti. Shortly after he was born, his family relocated to Saint-Hubert near Montreal where he was raised, and where he began his music career. Kaytranada's father was employed as a taxi driver and an estate agent, and his mother worked in healthcare. His parents divorced when he was 14. That same year, Kaytranada began to produce his own music after his brother Lou Phelps introduced him to FL Studio. The first song he ever sampled was Earth Wind & Fire's September, at 15 years old.  Kaytranada ended up dropping out of high school to pursue music full-time to help support his family financially.

In an April 2016 article with The Fader, Kaytranada disclosed that he was gay and discussed his anxiety about coming out to his family. In the same interview, he shared his hopes of avoiding being defined by his sexuality as he's seen peers be labeled in the industry. Later in May of that same year, during an interview with The Guardian, he further opened up about mental health struggles brought on by his sexuality, which he said contributed to an identity crisis.

Career
Celestin began his career under the name Kaytradamus in 2010. He released two projects as Kaytradamus before changing his name to Kaytranada in 2012. Kaytranada was on the roster of HW&W Recordings, an independent label based in Los Angeles and Toronto. Kaytranada has released 13 projects and 41 remixes. He has toured more than 50 Canadian, American, European and Australian cities.

In December 2014, he signed an exclusive recording agreement with XL Recordings. During 2015, Kaytranada opened for two nights of Madonna's Rebel Heart Tour, one in Canada and one in the United States. Speculation arose that Kaytranada and producer Rick Rubin had started working together when a photo of them surfaced online around February 2015. It was later confirmed that they had formed a partnership backed by Pulse Recordings.

His debut album, 99.9%, was released on May 6, 2016. The album includes features from GoldLink, AlunaGeorge, Syd, Anderson .Paak, and Vic Mensa, among others. He also collaborated with Craig David on the song "Got It Good", which is on David's sixth studio album, Following My Intuition. Kaytranada won the 2016 Polaris Music Prize for his album 99.9%. The album received a score of 8.0 from Pitchfork.

On December 13, 2019, his second album, Bubba, was released on RCA Records. It received a score of 8.1 from Pitchfork.

On March 14, 2021 Kaytranada won a Grammy for Best Dance Recording for '10%' and Best Dance/Electronic Album for 'Bubba'.

On October 13, 2022, it was leaked on Apple Music that Kaytranada would feature on 2 songs, I’m Lying and High Grade, of Lancey Foux’s album LIFE IN HELL, which would release on October 28th, 2022.

Discography

Since 2010, Kaytranada has released two studio albums, two studio EPs, numerous singles, and at least a dozen beat tapes. He is also a prolific remix artist and has released a series of collaborative projects with The Celestics and Robert Glasper, among others.

Studio albums
 99.9% (2016)
 Bubba (2019)

Production discography

Awards and nominations

References

External links 

Official website
Kaytranada on Spotify
Kaytranada on Apple Music

1992 births
Living people
Haitian LGBT people
Canadian electronic musicians
Canadian house musicians
Canadian experimental musicians
Canadian Internet celebrities
Black Canadian musicians
Canadian gay musicians
Grammy Award winners
XL Recordings artists
RCA Records artists
Musicians from Montreal
Haitian emigrants to Canada
People from Port-au-Prince
Canadian DJs
LGBT DJs
LGBT hip hop musicians
Polaris Music Prize winners
Juno Award for Electronic Album of the Year winners
Canadian hip hop DJs
Black Canadian LGBT people
Electronic dance music DJs
LGBT record producers
Canadian hip hop record producers
People from Longueuil
Juno Award for Dance Recording of the Year winners
20th-century Canadian LGBT people
21st-century Canadian LGBT people